Carl Kress (born February 3, 1937) is an American film editor. He won an Academy Award in the category Best Film Editing for the film The Towering Inferno.

Selected filmography 
 The Towering Inferno (1974; co-won with Harold F. Kress)

References

External links 

1937 births
Living people
People from Los Angeles
American film editors
American television editors
Best Film Editing Academy Award winners